Baiyyappanahalli may refer to:

 Baiyyappanahalli or New Baiyyappanahalli, a neighborhood in Bangalore.
 Baiyyappanahalli railway station, a railway station in Baiyyappanahalli, Bangalore.
 Baiyyappanahalli Terminal railway station, an upcoming railway station in Baiyyappanahalli, Bangalore.
 Baiyappanahalli metro station, a metro station in Baiyyappanahalli, Bangalore.
 Baiyyappanahalli Manavarthe Kaval or Old Baiyyappanahalli, former village and present neighborhood in Bangalore.
 Vimanapura, also known as Baiyyappanahalli Vimanapura is an eastern suburb of Bangalore in Karnataka in India
 Baiyyappanahalli, Bangalore East, a village in Bangalore East Taluk, Bangalore Urban district
 Baiyyappanahalli, Bangalore North, a village in Bangalore North Taluk, Bangalore Urban district
 Baiyyappanahalli, Doddaballapur, a village in Doddaballapur Taluk, Bangalore Rural district
 Baiyyappanahalli, Kolar, a village in Kolar Taluk, Kolar district
 Baiyyappanahalli, Malur, a village in Malur Taluk, Kolar district
 Baiyyappanahalli, Chikkaballapur, a village in Chikkaballapur Taluk, Chikkaballapur district
 Baiyyappanahalli, Sidlaghatta, a village in Sidlaghatta Taluk, Chikkaballapur district